Mirza Delimeđac (born 24 October 1999) is a Bosnian footballer currently playing as a midfielder for Kukësi.

Club career
He was only registered for the AFC cup during the season and played occasionally in the youth league.

Due to the lack of playing time, he returned to his childhood club, FK Novi Pazar who was relegated to Division 3 for the 2019-2020 season. On 6 June 2022 he moved to the Bulgarian First League team of Septemvri Sofia.

Career statistics

Club

Notes

References

1999 births
Living people
Sportspeople from Novi Pazar
Association football midfielders
Serbian footballers
Bosnia and Herzegovina footballers
Tampines Rovers FC players
FK Novi Pazar players
Singapore Premier League players
Serbian League players
Serbian First League players